Trouble for HAVOC is a superhero tabletop role-playing supplement, written by Yurek Chodak, Donald Harrington,  Charles Huber, and Steve Perrin, with art by Chris Marrinam, and published by Chaosium in year. The first anthology in the superhero game genre, has rules additions for Superworld, and three adventures containing  stats for Superworld, Villains and Vigilantes, and Champions. It was republished in PDF format in 2010.

Contents
Trouble for HAVOC includes three adventures involving a loosely-organized villain group named Havoc.
 "Crisis At Calliente" introduces HAVOC. The heroes are called to dislodge a group of villains from a nuclear reactor.
 "Return of the Elokians" includes a call for help, an earthquake, a confrontation with the villain King Snake, whose henchmen include members of HAVOC, and a lost world cavern occupied by a race facing extinction.
 "Fourth for Bridge?" is set in Antarctica, where several teams of super-beings—Americans, Russians, and a team from HAVOC—each try to be the first to the wreck of a spaceship landed in the ice. It is possible to play any team, or even play two or three teams in parallel if there are enough players. Pre-generated characters are proposed for each team but the players are free to substitute their usual characters.

Reception
Allen Varney reviewed Trouble for HAVOC in The Space Gamer No. 71. Varney commented that "If you want a lot of genuinely interesting superheroes and villains for your campaign, Trouble for Havoc is certainly worth examining.  If you hunger for subterranean action, you could do worse than the second scenario here.  But mostly the adventures are file-and-forget."

Reviews
Different Worlds #42 (May/June, 1986)

References

Role-playing game supplements introduced in 1984
Superhero role-playing game adventures